Maadhoo as a place name may refer to:
 Maadhoo (Gaafu Dhaalu Atoll) (Republic of Maldives)
 Maadhoo (Kaafu Atoll) (Republic of Maldives)